The Mutation is the 36th book in the Animorphs series, written by K.A. Applegate. It is known to have been ghostwritten by Erica Bobone. It is narrated by Jake.

Plot summary

While using their aquatic morphs to chase the Yeerks' new Sea Blade, which was after the Pemalite ship, the Animorphs and Ax find themselves beached inside an underwater cavern.  The cavern seems to be littered, however, with several different types of air and sea craft, with what appears to be human statues inside.  Further inspection by Cassie and Ax reveals that these people were real, and were killed and stuffed for preservation.  While attempting to escape and locate Visser Three, whose ship was taken by a strange, humanoid aquatic species, Jake, Cassie, Ax, Rachel, and Marco, all in their natural forms, are captured by these life-forms, who reveal themselves as Nartec. Tobias was on lookout above, and therefore was not captured. The Nartec queen explains that they once were humans who lived above water, and when their city sunk, they began to adapt to underwater life.  Ax realizes that radioactivity is what aided their ability to evolve so quickly.  He also surmises that the Nartec have inbred for years, except for possible breeding with their captives prior to killing them, so their genetic code is breaking down. After the Nartec queen, Queen Soco, makes it clear that she intends to "preserve" the Animorphs, she permits them to do some sightseeing, but warns them not to try and escape.

Of course, the Animorphs have no interest in being killed, stuffed, and added to a collection, so they plan to locate Tobias, figure out where Visser Three is hiding, and capture the Sea Blade to escape. However, their plans are foiled by a Nartec ambush from the water, and the Animorphs are taken to an operating room of sorts to be "preserved." Given a mind-numbing agent, Jake begins to slip away, when he notices a Nartec suddenly attacking the other Nartecs in the room and wiping them out. The rogue Nartec demorphs into a red-tailed hawk, Tobias, and aids the others in escaping. The Animorphs climb on board the Sea Blade, only to be challenged by hordes of Nartec, wielding weapons ranging from spears and clubs to automatic rifles and machine guns. While the Animorphs, in their standard combat morphs, had no difficulty attacking the Nartec and holding them at bay for a while, they began to be worn down by sheer force of number.  Finally, they struck a reluctant alliance with Visser Three, who had been hiding on the ship the whole time while his crew were killed and stuffed. The visser guides them in starting the Sea Blade and escaping. Under Jake's orders, Marco, whose gorilla morph was gutted by a sword, opened the hatch to the Sea Blade, and the Animorphs swam to the surface. Visser Three survived as well, though separated from the Animorphs.

New morphs

Animorphs books
1999 science fiction novels
Atlantis in fiction
Underwater novels